The 1996 Australian Film Institute Awards were awards held by the Australian Film Institute to celebrate the best of Australian films and television of 1996. The awards ceremony was held at Melbourne Town Hall on Friday 15 November 1996 and broadcast on ABC-TV.

Feature film

Television

References

External links
 Official AACTA website

AACTA Awards ceremonies
1996 in Australian cinema